Mohammadabad (also Romanized as Moḩammadābād; also known as Maḩmūdābād) is a village in Pa Qaleh Rural District, in the Central District of Shahr-e Babak County, Kerman Province, Iran. At the 2006 census, its population was 13, in 5 families.

References 

Populated places in Shahr-e Babak County